The All Pakistan Women's Association, or APWA, as it is commonly known, is a voluntary, non-profit and non-political Pakistani organisation whose fundamental aim is the promotion of moral, social and economic welfare of the women of Pakistan.

APWA was founded in 1949 by Begum Ra'ana Liaquat Ali Khan, a famous activist for women's rights, who had said that the role of women is no less important than that of men. Initially APWA was formed to handle the refugee crisis in the newly independent Pakistan after the 1947 partition of British India. Zaib-un-Nissa Hamidullah, Pakistan's first woman editor and publisher, was one of APWA's many prominent leaders and Zubeida Habib Rahimtoola was a dedicated member of the association.

APWA has been a very active organisation since its founding, with branches in 56 districts across Pakistan, and even in rural and urban areas. It celebrates major events such as International Women's Day, UN Day and UNICEF Day annually, and is a charity organisation which relies on donations to fund its work.

APWA received the UNESCO Adult Literacy Prize in 1974 and later the Peace Messenger Certificate in 1987.

After the secession of East Pakistan as Bangladesh in 1971, the organisation's branch in Dacca was renamed as Bangladesh Mahila Samiti.

In 2016, at the 68th anniversary of APWA's founding, an annual dinner at the High Commission of Pakistan, London was held to pay tribute to the APWA founder, Begum Ra'ana Liaquat Ali Khan. A speaker at the event said that Begum's vision motivated the Pakistani women to contribute positively to the Pakistani society.

Aims and objectives 
The aims and objectives of the All Pakistan Women's Association are briefly stated as follows:

 "The informed and intelligent participation of the women of Pakistan in the growth and development of their country.
 The advancement of the welfare of Pakistani Women through the Improvement of their Legal, Political, Social and Economic status.
 The promotion of educational and cultural programmes and policies all over the country.
 The Health and Wellbeing of the people of Pakistan in the home and in the community.
 The promotion of international goodwill and the brotherhood of mankind."

Affiliations and Associations 

APWA enjoys consultative status with the:

 Government of Pakistan
 ECOSOC i.e. the economic and social council

The APWA also keeps close touch with U.N. and its specialized agencies at home and abroad.

It is internationally affiliated with many organizations, such as:

 General Federation of Women's Clubs
 International Alliance of Women

On a national level, APWA is associated with:

 Ra'ana Craftman Colony
 APWA Cottage Industries
 Gul-e-Ra'ana Community Center
 Gul-e-Ra'ana Nusrat Industrial Home
 Women's International Art Club
 General Federation of Women's Clubs (GFWC)

Programs 
APWA offers programs in:
 Mother and child health services
 Nutrition Programmes at healthcare clinics
 Montessori/Primary Education schools
 Adult education/Literacy
 Social Education and Social Work among the needy
 Population and Family Planning Programs
 Legal Aid clinics
 Skill Training and Handicrafts Retail Shops
 R H Education
 Adolescents Programs
 Pharmacies and Dispensaries

Memberships are open to and provided to Pakistani women regardless of their caste, creed or colour. Non-Pakistani women are also welcome and eligible for memberships.

Projects 

APWA, before and after the partition of east and west Pakistan, covered the following fields:

 Social Welfare: this included numerous ventures in health volunteer's training, educationals programs, urban community developments, clinics, and hospitals. APWA also took the initiative in requesting a Ministry of Social Welfare and has been associated with many activities on national and international welfare agencies.
 Education: APWA runs hundreds of primary schools and mothers clubs, secondary schools for girls in Karachi and promotes literacy and the importance of education by constantly upgrading educational facilities. APWA created The Karachi College of Home Sciences and Home Science departments in universities located in Lahore and Dacca.
 Rural Reconstructions: APWA works in close proximity with the Government's Village Aid Programs and has developed Community Centers to promote general rural programs.
 International Affairs: APWA is in charge of covering all international conferences, delegation and arranging visits for foreign guests and visitors.
 Rights and Responsibilities for Women: APWA is responsible for educating women about their rights and responsibilities by holding seminars, meetings and seeking any necessary legislative or other actions.

Other projects include: distribution of relief materials, cultural affairs, advice & legal assistance, publicity and youth work.

Financing 
APWA receives funds from:

 Internal fund raising efforts
 Membership fees
 Government grants

Headquarters 
APWA Headquarters are located in Karachi, Pakistan. The governing body meets annually to make their principal policies.

Branches are also located in Lahore, Peshawar, London and Sri Lanka.

References

External links
APWA Pakistan, official website 

Women's organisations based in Pakistan
Liberal feminist organizations
Organizations established in 1949
Organisations based in Karachi
Charities based in Pakistan